African Americans are the largest racial minority in Virginia. According to the 2010 Census, more than 1.5 million, or one in five Virginians is "Black or African American". African Americans were enslaved in the state. As of the 2020 U.S. Census, African Americans were 18.6% of the state's population.

History

The first twenty African slaves from Angola landed in Virginia in 1619 on a Portuguese slave ship. Lynchings, racial segregation and white supremacy were prevalent in Virginia. The first African slaves arrived in the British colony Jamestown, Virginia and were then bought by English colonists.

Notable People
Rev. Cozy Bailey
Evelyn Reid Syphax
Mary Richards Bowser
Dorothy I. Height
Stan Maclin
Matilda Sissieretta Joyner Jones
Mary Smith Kelsey Peake
Winsome Earle-Sears
Gregory Hayes Swanson
Dr. Cameron Webb
Chris Brown
Trey Songz
Missy Elliott
Booker T. Washington
Pharrell Williams
Wanda Sykes
Plaxico Burress
Sally Hemings
Maggie L. Walker
L. Douglas Wilder
Anthony W. Gardiner
D’Angelo
Allen Iverson

See also

History of Virginia
Black Southerners
First Africans in Virginia
History of slavery in Virginia
Demographics of Virginia
List of African-American newspapers in Virginia

References

External links

The Rise of Slavery in Virginia
Slavery
The Origins of Slavery in Virginia
Notable Black Men and Women of Virginia
Telling Virginia's Full Story - African American History in VA
Black History and Culture - Virginia Is For Lovers

History of slavery in Virginia